Thaali Kattiya Raasaa is a 1992 Indian Tamil-language film directed by Vijaya Kanna and produced by M. Natarasan, Thanjai D. Pragadeshwaran, K. Selvam, and J. F. Raja. The film stars Murali, Kanaka, Senthamarai, and Anandaraj.

Plot
Mythili falls in love with Pandiyan, an educated man in her village. However, they have to first deal with Mythili's cruel father who in the past had ruined her sister's life.

Cast

Murali as Pandiyan
Kanaka as Mythili
Goundamani as tea stall owner
Senthil as tea stall employee
Senthamarai
Anandaraj
K. R. Savithri
Kuyili
Kullamani
Singamuthu
Dhatchayini
Sharmili
Sittal Mallika
Vijayammal
Madurai Soraja
Mary
Radha Krishnan
Dhanapal
S. A. Rajkumar (special appearance)

Soundtrack
The music was composed by S. A. Rajkumar.

References

1992 films
1990s Tamil-language films